The 2020 Dunlop Trophy Championship was a motor racing championship for production cars held across England. The Trophy championship was created specifically for production vehicles as a Britcar championship separate from the much faster GT and Touring Cars of the Endurance Championship. It is the 19th season of a Britcar championship and the 1st Britcar Trophy Championship season. 

2020 was the inaugural season of the Britcar Trophy Championship. The season began on 11 July at Croft Circuit and ended on 1 November at Snetterton Circuit. All rounds took place on the same weekend as the Britcar Endurance Championship rounds. There was also a non-championship round at the Spa-Francorchamps in support of the 2019-20 FIA World Endurance Championship, where the Trophy category competitors participated in two races with the Endurance Category cars. 

The championship included Class 5, 6 and 7 cars. The Michelin Clio Cup Series also joined the Britcar Trophy Championship grid for the inaugural season with the Clio cars having a separate class but still eligible to compete for the overall championship title.

2020 Class Champions and Overall Trophy Championship Places 

Oliver Smith won the Class 6 championship and overall Trophy title with 191 points, Johnathan Barrett won the Class 7 championship and was second overall with 188 points and Charlie Campbell and Rob Smith won the Class 5 championship and were third overall with 177.5 points. The Clio class champions were Aaron and Steve Thompson with 137.5 points.

Calendar
The planned opening round at Donington Park, to be held on 10 April 2020, was eventually cancelled due to the pandemic. The non-championship round at Spa-Francorchamps was postponed due to the COVID-19 pandemic.
 and moved to 15 August. The revised championship was contested over 9 races at 5 rounds, with best 7 results counting.

Teams and drivers
{|
|

Entries that didn't participate
These entries were previously announced to compete in the 2020 season but couldn't due to the 2019-20 coronavirus pandemic.

Results

Overall championship standings 

Points are awarded as follows in all classes

† – Drivers did not finish the race, but were classified as they completed over 60% of the race distance and were awarded half points.

Class championship standings 

Points are awarded as follows in all classes

† – Drivers did not finish the race, but were classified as they completed over 60% of the race distance and were awarded half points.

References

External links

Britcar
Britcar
Britcar Trophy Championship seasons
Britcar Trophy Championship